The 2013 Andy Murray tennis season officially began at the Brisbane International where he was the defending champion. He successfully defended that title, defeating Grigor Dimitrov in straight sets in the final. After a quarterfinal showing at Indian Wells, where he lost to Juan Martín del Potro in 3 sets, Murray recovered to win the Miami Masters for the second time, defeating David Ferrer in the final. Winning in Miami meant that Murray overtook Roger Federer as World No. 2, the first time Murray had held the ranking since September 2009, meaning that neither Federer nor Rafael Nadal were ranked in the top 2 for the first time since the end of 2003. During the summer Murray won his first Wimbledon title, defeating Novak Djokovic in the final in straight sets to end Britain's 77-year wait for a home grown men's champion. It was Murray's second major title, and third consecutive title on grass, after winning at the Olympics the previous year, meaning he extended his winning streak on grass to 18 matches. In the summer hard court season, Murray failed to defend his US Open title, losing to Stanislas Wawrinka in the quarterfinals. Following the Davis Cup World Group Play-offs, during which Murray won both his singles and the doubles rubber, he ended his season prematurely in order to undergo surgery on a long-standing back problem that had caused him trouble for over a year and a half. He ended the season ranked number 4 in the world, behind Nadal, Djokovic and Ferrer.

Yearly summary

Australian Open series

Brisbane International
Murray began his season at the 2013 Brisbane International, where he was the top seed. He defeated Australian John Millman, Denis Istomin of Uzbekistan and Kei Nishikori of Japan (retired) en route to reaching the final for the second consecutive year. Here he faced Bulgarian young gun Grigor Dimitrov, who was competing in his first tour-level final. Despite being broken in the first set, Murray came back to dominate the tiebreak, winning 7 points in a row, then proceeding the second set by 6 games to 4, thus successfully defending his Brisbane title. The victory in Brisbane took Murray's career titles tally to 25, and at the trophy ceremony, Murray dedicated the victory to close friend and Davis Cup teammate Ross Hutchins, who at the time had just been diagnosed with Hodgkin's Lymphoma.

Australian Open
Murray next competed at the 2013 Australian Open, where he was the No. 3 seed. He made light work of his first two matches, defeating Dutchman Robin Haase and Portugal's João Sousa respectively, each in straight sets, to set up a third round meeting with his practice partner Ričardas Berankis of Lithuania, who had qualified for the tournament the previous week. Despite having his service broken several times, Murray managed to defeat Berankis in straight sets. He next faced French 14th seed Gilles Simon in the fourth round, winning in straight sets and subsequently advancing to the quarter-finals for the ninth straight Grand Slam tournament, and without dropping a set. In the semifinals, Murray met Roger Federer in their first Grand Slam semifinal and fourth Grand Slam meeting overall, their previous three meetings all having come in finals. After exchanging sets over the first four, including Federer taking the second and fourth each in tiebreaks, Murray eventually prevailed in five sets to set up a second consecutive final against Novak Djokovic. In beating Federer, Murray also matched Fred Perry's Grand Slam match win total of 106. In the final against Djokovic, Murray took the first set in a tiebreak, but ultimately lost in four sets, an untimely double fault in the second set proving fatal.

Spring American hardcourt season

Indian Wells
Following his final defeat in Melbourne, Murray took a six-week break in order to train for the first two Masters 1000 series tournaments of the year. He entered the 2013 BNP Paribas Open having not won a match since 2010, when he reached the quarterfinals, so had minimum points to defend. After receiving a bye into round two, the Scot faced Russian Evgeny Donskoy, the first meeting between the two. Murray dropped the first set in the 12th game, however then went on to win the next two sets for the loss of just 4 games. He won both of his next two matches in straight sets, against Chinese Taipei's Yen-hsun Lu and Argentine Carlos Berlocq respectively to set up a quarterfinal clash with Juan Martín del Potro. Despite holding a strong advantage in their head-to-head, having won 5 out of 6 meetings, Murray wasn't able to capitalise on winning the opening set in a tiebreaker, losing in three sets to the eventual finalist.

Miami Masters
Following his defeat in Indian Wells, Murray returned to Miami for the Sony Open Tennis tournament. Murray faced two potentially tricky opponents in young up-and-comers Bernard Tomic of Australia, and Bulgarian Grigor Dimitrov respectively, however overcame both in straight sets. He backed this up with an 84-minute victory over Italian Andreas Seppi, making it to his fourth straight quarterfinal of the year, where he faced Marin Čilić of Croatia. Despite a considerable number of lengthy games and rallies, including nine breaks of serve, one game that lasted over 15 minutes, and seven match points, Murray triumphed in just over an hour and a half in straight sets, to reach the semifinals of the Miami Masters for the fourth time. In the semifinals, Murray faced Frenchman Richard Gasquet, who had beaten fourth seed Tomas Berdych in the last 8. Murray lost the first set in a tiebreak, despite serving for the set at 5-4, before taking the second and third sets for the loss of just three games. In the final Murray faced Spaniard David Ferrer, the second time the two have met in a final at a Masters 1000 tournament. After losing the first five games of the match, Murray eventually won in three sets, after saving a match point at 6–5 down on serve in the final set, following which he dominated the tiebreak to win his second Miami title, and 9th masters 1000 title overall. Following this victory, Murray moved up to No. 2 in the world rankings for the first time since September 2009, thus marking the first time in almost ten years in which neither Roger Federer or Rafael Nadal was ranked inside the top two.

European clay court season
Following a two-week break, Murray headed to Monaco for the Monte-Carlo Rolex Masters, where Spaniard Rafael Nadal was 8-time defending champion. After receiving a bye into the second round, Murray won his opening match against qualifier Edouard Roger-Vasselin of France in straight sets, before being defeated by Swiss number 2 Stanislas Wawrinka, who had previously won both of their previous meetings on clay. Due to this, Murray dropped to World No. 3 in the week starting 22 April 2013.

At the Mutua Madrid Open, Murray faced Florian Mayer of Germany in the second round, after a first round bye. Despite facing several set points, the Scot overcame the German number 3 in straight sets to record his 400th career win. He faced Frenchman Gilles Simon in round three, and needed three hours, three sets and 6 match points to record his 11th straight victory over Simon, and reach his first clay court quarterfinal of the year. He will next play against the 2012 runner-up Tomas Berdych, whom Murray has defeated three times in their past four meetings, however has yet to record a victory over the Czech on clay. Murray will also return to the number 2 ranking after the tournaments conclusion, following a defeat of Roger Federer by Japanese rising star Kei Nishikori in the third round. In the quarter-finals, Murray lost to Tomáš Berdych in straight sets. At the Rome Masters, Murray recovered from a set and a double break down against Marcel Granollers to level the match in a tie-break, only to retire before the start of the third set, citing a back injury. This was the first time Murray had retired mid-match since Hamburg in 2007, when he withdrew from his match against Filippo Volandri during the first set, despite being a double break up.

The back injury he suffered in Rome ultimately forced him to withdraw from the French Open, making this the first Grand Slam tournament since Wimbledon in 2007 that he has missed due to injury. Despite aiming to improve his clay court results, Murray only managed to gain 10 points more than 2012 in the lead up to the French Open, as over-preparation ultimately lead to him aggravating a recurring back injury.

Grass court season

Queen's Club Championships
Murray entered the grass court season having won 12 of his previous 13 matches on grass, spanning back to last year's Wimbledon, and having not lost since the final. His first tournament after missing the French Open was at the Queen's Club Championships, where he was the top seed. After receiving a first round bye, Murray's first match in the second round pitted him against Nicolas Mahut, who had knocked him out at the same stage the previous year. Despite not having competed for a month, Murray overcame Mahut in straight sets, which he followed up with straight sets wins over Marinko Matosevic and Benjamin Becker respectively. His first match against a top 10 opponent came in the form of Jo-Wilfried Tsonga, whom Murray had defeated in the final two years previously. He overcame a slow start that saw him lose the first set to win in three, and set up a clash with 5th seed and defending champion Marin Čilić. Once again Murray had to recover from a set down, and went on to defeat Čilić in three sets to win his third Queen's title, becoming the first British man since Arthur Gore to win the tournament three times. The final was followed by a charity doubles match with Tim Henman, fellow top 10 player Tomas Berdych and former world no. 1 and Murray's coach Ivan Lendl. The match was organised to raise money for the Royal Marsden Cancer Charity, after Murray's Davis Cup teammate and close friend Ross Hutchins was diagnosed with Hodgkins Lymphoma in December 2012.

Wimbledon
At Wimbledon, Murray made it through his first three matches without losing a set, his first round match, in which he defeated German Benjamin Becker, whom he had defeated at Queen's Club just weeks earlier, took Murray's Grand Slam match wins total to 107, surpassing Fred Perry's total, making Murray the British player with most all time match wins at Grand Slam tournaments. Murray then beat Lu Yen-hsun of Chinese Taipei in round two, and Spanish 32nd seed Tommy Robredo in the third, against whom Murray hadn't played since 2009. In the fourth round match Murray beat Russian Mikhail Youzhny in straight sets despite going 5-2 down in the second set (which, like the previous round, was also the first meeting between the two since 2009). In the quarterfinals, Murray met left-hander Fernando Verdasco of Spain, who had beaten Murray in their previous Grand Slam meeting. Verdasco won the first two sets, before Murray raised his level of play considerably, eventually coming through to win in five sets and reach his fifth consecutive Wimbledon semifinal, tying him with John McEnroe in fourth place for most consecutive semifinals at Wimbledon behind Roger Federer, Jimmy Connors and Björn Borg. Murray faced Jerzy Janowicz of Poland in the semifinals, against whom Murray lost in the 2012 Paris Masters. Despite dropping the opening set in a tiebreak, the Scot eventually prevailed in four to set up a fourth Grand Slam final against Novak Djokovic, the second meeting between the two at SW19, and the first at the Championships.  Murray defeated Djokovic in straight sets (6-4, 7-5, 6-4) to become the first British man to win Wimbledon since 1936, the first Scot of either sex to win a Wimbledon singles title since 1896, as well as becoming the 7th man in the open era to complete the Queen's/Wimbledon double. With the win, Murray extended his winning streak on grass to 18 matches, his previous loss coming at the 2012 Wimbledon Final.

US Open Series

Rogers Cup
Following a break of around 4 weeks, Murray's next tournament was the Canada Masters held in Montreal. He was aiming to win his third title at the event, second masters 1000 title of the year and 10th masters series title of his career. His first opponent was Spaniard Marcel Granollers, who had won the title in Kitzbühel, whom Murray defeated in straight sets to set up a clash with Ernest Gulbis of Latvia. Despite having lost all 5 of their previous meetings, Gulbis took advantage of Murray's lack of competitive play and defeated the Scot in straight sets, his first loss since he retired at the Rome Masters in May.

In the doubles competition, Murray partnered fellow Scot Colin Fleming, due to the absence of Jonathan Marray from the draw. The pair opened with a victory over Frenchman Julien Benneteau and former world no. 1 Nenad Zimonjic of Serbia. They then went on to defeat three seeded teams, including two former world no. 1's. The pair defeated 2012 Australian Open champions Leander Paes and Radek Stepanek, fourth seeds Aisam-ul-Haq Qureshi & Jean-Julien Rojer, and 8 time Grand Slam champion Daniel Nestor & three-time Wimbledon finalist Robert Lindstedt to reach their first doubles final at a Masters 1000 tournament. In the final they faced third seeds Alexander Peya & Bruno Soares, however were defeated in straight sets, despite holding two set points in the second set. As a result of his run to the final, Murray will return to the top-100 in doubles for the first time since 2011.

Western & Southern Open
Murray opened his bid for a third Cincinnati title with two strong wins, defeating Russian Mikhail Youzhny and Julien Benneteau of France each in straight sets, for the loss of just 9 games between them. He then went on to meet Tomas Berdych in the quarterfinals, however was unable to maintain his level of play against the Czech and went out in straight sets, the second time in a row Murray had lost to Berdych without winning a set.

US Open
Murray dropped to number 3 in the rankings prior to the US Open, meaning he would potentially have to face both Novak Djokovic and Rafael Nadal in order to defend his title. He was made to wait until the third day of play to begin his title defence, however opened strongly with a straight sets win over Frenchman Michaël Llodra. The next round proved slightly tougher, as Argentine Leonardo Mayer took him to four sets. His next match was against German Florian Mayer, whom he defeated in straight sets, winning the last two comfortably after being taken to a tiebreaker in the first. He faced Denis Istomin of Uzbekistan in the fourth round, who also took Murray to four sets, taking the first in a tiebreak before Murray upped his level and won the next three comfortably to set up a quarterfinal clash with ninth seed Stanislas Wawrinka. In what was anticipated as a tough match, Wawrinka controlled the match throughout, sending a below par Murray out in straight sets. Murray shortly after flew to Croatia to begin preparations for the Davis Cup World Group Play-offs on clay.

Indoor Season
After a disappointing American hardcourt season, Murray took the decision to undergo surgery on his lower back, in the hope of fixing a disc problem that had caused him pain since early 2012. Whilst problems in his lower back seemingly subsided since Wimbledon 2012, Murray revealed that it flared up again during the clay court season, and also caused him discomfort during the US Open Series. As a result, he stated that he would definitely miss the Asian swing of tournaments, pulling out of events in Bangkok, Tokyo and Shanghai, and subsequently from the Paris Masters and the World Tour Finals. It was announced that it was likely he would return to action at the beginning of the 2014 season at the Australian Open.

All matches
This table chronicles all the matches of Murray in 2013, including walkovers (W/O) which the ATP does not count as wins. They are marked ND for non-decision or no decision.

Singles matches

Doubles matches

Tournament schedule

Singles Schedule

2012 source
2013 source

Yearly Records

Head-to-head matchups
Ordered by number of wins
(Bold denotes a top 10 player at the time of match, Italic means top 50)

  Benjamin Becker 2–0
  Marin Čilić 2–0
  Grigor Dimitrov  2–0
  Denis Istomin 2–0
  Florian Mayer 2–0
  Gilles Simon 2–0
  Lu Yen-hsun 2–0
  Mikhail Youzhny 2–0
  Julien Benneteau 1–0
  Ričardas Berankis 1–0
  Carlos Berlocq 1–0
  Jérémy Chardy 1–0
  Borna Ćorić 1–0
  Ivan Dodig 1–0
  Evgeny Donskoy 1–0
  Roger Federer 1–0
  David Ferrer 1–0
  Richard Gasquet 1–0
  Robin Haase 1–0
  Jerzy Janowicz 1–0
  Michaël Llodra 1–0
  Nicolas Mahut 1–0
  Marinko Matosevic 1–0
  Leonardo Mayer 1–0
  John Millman 1–0
  Kei Nishikori 1–0
  Tommy Robredo 1–0
  Édouard Roger-Vasselin 1–0
  Andreas Seppi 1–0
  João Sousa 1–0
  Bernard Tomic 1–0
  Jo-Wilfried Tsonga 1–0
  Fernando Verdasco 1–0
  Novak Djokovic 1–1
  Marcel Granollers 1–1
  Juan Martín del Potro 0–1
  Ernest Gulbis 0–1
  Tomáš Berdych 0–2
  Stanislas Wawrinka 0–2

Finals

Singles: 5 (4–1)

Doubles: 1 (0–1)

Earnings

Bold font denotes tournament win

See also
2013 Roger Federer tennis season
2013 Rafael Nadal tennis season
2013 Novak Djokovic tennis season
2013 ATP World Tour

References

External links
 
2013 Schedule at ATP Tour
2013 Schedule at Official Site 

2013 Andy Murray tennis season
Murray tennis season
Murray tennis season